She County may refer to two counties of the People's Republic of China:

 She County, Anhui (歙县)
 She County, Hebei (涉县)